Campbell Hills is a group of hills  west-southwest of Cape Lyttelton on the south side of Nimrod Glacier. They were mapped by the U.S. Geological Survey from tellurometer surveys and Navy air photos between 1960 and 1962, and named by the Advisory Committee on Antarctic Names for William Joseph Campbell, a U.S. Antarctic Research Program glaciologist at the Ross Ice Shelf, 1962–63.

References

Mountains of the Ross Dependency
Shackleton Coast